Associazione Calcio Milan, colloquially known as Milan Women or simply Milan, is an Italian women's association football club affiliated with A.C. Milan, the professional football club in Milan. It was established in 2018 by acquiring the Serie A licence of a Capriolo, Brescia-based team Brescia Calcio Femminile. The team compete in Serie A and are based out of the Centro Sportivo Vismara.

History 
Although the city of Milan has had more than one women's team in the past which took up the same name and colors of the popular men's A.C. Milan club, such as the Associazione Calcio Femminile Milan born in 1965, or the Associazione Calcio Femminile Milan 82 founded in 1982, or the more recent Football Milan Ladies born in 2013, none of these entities has ever had any connection with the men's club, which established its women's section only on 11 June 2018, after taking over Brescia's Serie A license. 

The 12-time Serie A leading goalscorer and first woman to be inducted into the Italian Football Hall of Fame Carolina Morace was named as the inaugural head coach. Milan's first season saw the team finish in 3rd place, missing out on qualification to the UEFA Women's Champions League by 1 point. Valentina Giacinti won the league Golden Boot with 21 goals, while her Milan teammate Daniela Sabatino finished in 2nd with 17 goals.

On 25 June 2019 Maurizio Ganz was appointed as the new women's first team coach, signing a 2-year contract. The following two seasons, 2020-21 and 2021-22, proved very positive for the club, despite the lack of trophies, having reached the second place in the 2020-21 Serie A, and with defeats in both the 2020-21 Coppa Italia final (on penalties, against Roma) and the 2021 Italian Supercup final (against Juventus).

Current squad

Managerial history
Below is a list of A.C. Milan Women coaches from 2018 until the present day.

Honours
Serie A
Runners-up (1): 2020–21
Coppa Italia
Runners-up (1): 2020–21
Supercoppa Italiana
Runners-up (1): 2021

See also 
 :Category:A.C. Milan Women players 
 List of women's association football clubs
 List of women's football clubs in Italy

Notes

References

External links 
 Official website 

 
Women's football clubs in Italy
Sport in Milan
Association football clubs established in 2018
A.C. Milan
Serie A (women's football) clubs
2018 establishments in Italy